Sitaraman is a surname. Notable people with the surname include:

Ganesh Sitaraman, American legal scholar
Ramesh Sitaraman, Indian American computer scientist 
Suresh Sitaraman, Indian American professor
Viputheshwar Sitaraman (born 1997), American designer, entrepreneur, and scientist